"Hold My Hand" is a popular song, written by Jack Lawrence and Richard Myers. It was written in 1950 but not published until 1953.

Don Cornell version
The hit version in 1953 was a recording by Don Cornell. The song was featured in the film Susan Slept Here (1954), and was nominated for the 1954 Academy Award for Best Song. Cornell recorded on the Coral Records label. His version of "Hold My Hand" was produced by Bob Thiele. It reached No. 1 in the UK Singles Chart for four weeks in October 1954, and peaked at #2 on the US Most Played By Disc Jockeys chart.

Other recordings
"Hold My Hand" has also been recorded by: 
Stanley Black
Nat King Cole
Larry Cross with orchestra and Enoch Light
Arild Andresen, piano with guitar and bass recorded it in Oslo on March 11, 1955, as the first melody of the medley "Klaver-Cocktail No. 2" along with "Just One More Chance" and "Dedicated to You". The medley was released on the 78 rpm record His Master's Voice A.L. 2513.

References

External links
Jack Lawrence's story of the history of the song

1950 songs
1954 singles
UK Singles Chart number-one singles
Pop ballads
Songs written for films
Songs with lyrics by Jack Lawrence